The House at 196 Main Street (also known as the Hiram Eaton House) is a historic house located at 196 Main Street in Wakefield, Massachusetts.

Description and history 
The house was built in the 1840s or 1850s, probably for Hiram Eaton, member of a locally prominent family. The house is a well-preserved Greek Revival house,  stories in height and five bays wide, with a side-gable roof pierced by three gabled dormers. It has a side-hall plan and its front porch is supported by delicately fluted columns, a rarity in the town for the period indicating means and sophistication.

The house was listed on the National Register of Historic Places on July 6, 1989.

See also
National Register of Historic Places listings in Wakefield, Massachusetts
National Register of Historic Places listings in Middlesex County, Massachusetts

References

Houses on the National Register of Historic Places in Wakefield, Massachusetts
Houses in Wakefield, Massachusetts
Greek Revival houses in Massachusetts